Roman Fosti (born 6 June 1983) is an Estonian long-distance runner who specialises in the marathon. He competed at the 2015 World Championships in Beijing finishing 20th, the 2016 Olympic Games in Rio de Janeiro finishing 61st, and the 2017 World Championships in London finishing 53rd. He previously competed mostly in middle-distance events switching to the marathon in 2013.

Major competition record

Personal bests
Outdoor
800 metres – 1:49.07 (Dessau 2005)
1500 metres – 3:46.18 (Tartu 2011)
Half marathon – 1:03:03 (Gdynia 2020)
Marathon – 2:10:46 (Siena 2021)
Indoor
1500 metres – 3:48.72 (Tartu 2012)

References

External links

1983 births
Living people
Estonian male middle-distance runners
Estonian male long-distance runners
Estonian male marathon runners
World Athletics Championships athletes for Estonia
Place of birth missing (living people)
Athletes (track and field) at the 2016 Summer Olympics
Olympic athletes of Estonia
Athletes (track and field) at the 2020 Summer Olympics
Olympic male marathon runners